Whakakai is a genus of baleen whale from the Late Oligocene (Chattian) Kokoamu Greensand of New Zealand.

Classification
Phylogenetic analysis recovers Whakakai outside crown Mysticeti as the sister taxon of Horopeta.

Paleobiology
Whakakai has been recovered in the same deposits that have also yielded the primitive odontocetes Awamokoa, Austrosqualodon, Otekaikea, and Waipatia, the eomysticetids Matapanui, Tohoraata, Tokarahia, and Waharoa, and the balaenomorphs Mauicetus and Horopeta.

References

Oligocene mammals of Oceania
Oligocene cetaceans
Extinct animals of New Zealand
Prehistoric cetacean genera